A Moldovan passport is an international document issued to citizens of the Republic of Moldova for the purpose of international travel. The passport is issued by the Public Services Agency and by Moldovan foreign representations abroad. The passport is valid for ten years. For children under the age of seven years it is valid for four years. Since 1 January 2006, Moldovan citizens can hold two passports simultaneously, providing a written request has been submitted to local passport office.

The first Moldovan biometric passport was issued on 1 January 2006. The new obligatory Moldovan biometric passport is available from 1 January 2011 and it costs at the moment 850 MDL (€39). The passport of the Republic of Moldova with biometric data contains a chip which stores the following digital information: holder's blood type, digital fingerprints and holder's digital image. For children under the age of 12 years it is not obligatory to submit digital fingerprints. Current non-biometric and old biometric passports will remain valid until expiration date and will be valid for travel along with new biometric passports.

Physical appearance
The Moldovan passport has the Moldovan Coat of Arms emblazoned in the centre of the front cover. The most recently issued passports are burgundy in color, however previously issued ones are light blue in colour. The words "REPUBLICA MOLDOVA" are inscribed above the coat of arms and the word "PAȘAPORT" is inscribed below the coat of arms (both inscriptions in Romanian). The standard biometric symbol imprinted at the bottom of the cover page. The passport contains 32 pages.

Types

Diplomatic (Black) 
Official (Green) 
Simple (Burgundy Red or Light Blue)

Data page and signature page
Each passport has a data page.
A data page has a visual zone and a machine-readable zone. The visual zone has a digitized photograph of the passport holder, data about the passport, and data about the passport holder:
Photograph 
Document Type 
Country Code MDA
Passport Serial No. 
Surname 
Given Name(s) 
Nationality (which states Republic of Moldova as an opposed to the ethnic identity of a person) 
Date of Birth (DD/MM/YYYY) 
Personal Number 
Sex 
Place of Birth 
Date of Issue 
Issuing Authority or Office 
Date of Expiration 
Holder's Blood Type 
Holder's Signature

Languages
The data page is printed in Romanian, English and French languages.

Visa free travel

Visa requirements for Moldovan citizens are administrative entry restrictions by the authorities of other states placed on citizens of Moldova. In 2022, Moldovan citizens had visa-free or visa on arrival access to 120 countries and territories, ranking the Moldovan passport 45th in the world.

See also
 Romanian passport
 Transnistrian passport
 Visa requirements for Moldovan citizens
 Visa policy of Moldova

Gallery

References

External links
Information on Obtaining Identity Documents 
Moldovan Nationality Law 
Moldovan passport on PRADO
Moldovan Identity Card

Moldova
Passport
Law of Moldova